Abdoul Razack Guiebre (born 17 July 1997) is a Burkinabé professional footballer who plays as a winger for  club Reggiana on loan from Modena and the Burkina Faso national team.

Club career
Guiebre moved to Italy at the age of 3 with his family, and began playing football locally. He is a youth product of the academies of Forlì, Ronco and Meldola. He began his senior career with Rimini in 2016, and helped them get promoted twice from the Eccellenza, into the Serie C in 2017. From there, he had a stint with Rieti before transferring to Monopoli in 2020.

On 23 August 2022, Guiebre signed a three-year contract with Modena. On 1 September 2022, he was loaned to Reggiana.

International career
Guiebre was called up to the Burkina Faso national team for a set of friendlies in March 2022. He debuted for the Burkina Faso national team in a friendly 5–0 loss to Kosovo on 24 March 2022.

References

External links
 
 
 

1997 births
Living people
Burkinabé emigrants to Italy
Burkinabé footballers
Association football wingers
Serie C players
Serie D players
Eccellenza players
Forlì F.C. players
Rimini F.C. 1912 players
F.C. Rieti players
S.S. Monopoli 1966 players
Modena F.C. 2018 players
A.C. Reggiana 1919 players
Burkina Faso international footballers